Karl Otto Schnell (September 20, 1899 – May 31, 1992) was a Major League Baseball pitcher.

Schnell attended Saint Mary's College of California. He played for the Cincinnati Reds in 1922 and 1923.

In 11 appearances over two seasons, Schnell was 0-0 with an earned run average of 4.29, with 21 innings pitched, allowing 23 hits, 14 runs, 10 earned runs , 20 bases on balls, 5 strikeouts and 6 games finished.

External links

1899 births
1992 deaths
Baseball players from Los Angeles
Major League Baseball pitchers
Cincinnati Reds players
Saint Mary's Gaels baseball players